Health care fraud includes "snake oil" marketing, health insurance fraud, drug fraud, and medical fraud. Health insurance fraud occurs when a company or an individual defrauds an insurer or government health care program, such as Medicare (United States) or equivalent State programs. The manner in which this is done varies, and persons engaging in fraud are always seeking new ways to circumvent the law. Damages from fraud can be recovered by use of the False Claims Act, most commonly under the qui tam provisions which rewards an individual for being a "whistleblower", or relator (law).

Recent news and statistics
The FBI estimates that Health Care Fraud costs American tax payers $80 billion a year. Of this amount $2.5 billion was recovered through False Claims Act cases in FY 2010. Most of these cases were filed under qui tam provisions.

Over the course of FY 2010, whistleblowers were paid a total of $307,620,401.00 for their part in bringing the cases forward.

Federal Statute

Under federal law, health care fraud in the United States is defined, and made illegal, primarily by the health care fraud statute in  states
(a)Whoever knowingly executes, or attempts to execute, a scheme or artifice—
(1) to defraud a financial institution; or
(2) to obtain, by means of false or fraudulent pretenses, representations, or promises, any of the money or property owned by, or under the custody or control of, any health care benefit program,
in connection with the delivery of or payment for health care benefits, items, or services, shall be fined under this title or imprisoned not more than 10 years, or both. If the violation results in serious bodily injury (as defined in section 1365 of this title), such person shall be fined under this title or imprisoned not more than 20 years, or both; and if the violation results in death, such person shall be fined under this title, or imprisoned for any term of years or for life, or both.(b)With respect to violations of this section, a person need not have actual knowledge of this section or specific intent to commit a violation of this section.

Types
There are several different schemes used to defraud the Health care system.
Billing for services not rendered
Upcoding of services
Upcoding of items
Duplicate claims
Unbundling
Excessive services
Unnecessary services
Kickbacks
Copied and pasted entries into the medical record

Billing for services not rendered
Often done as a way of billing Medicare for things that never happened. This can involve forging the signature of those enrolled in Medicare, and the use of bribes or "kickbacks" to corrupt medical professionals.

Upcoding of services
Billing Medicare programs for services that are more costly than the actual procedure that was done.

Upcoding of items
Similar to upcoding of services, but involving the use of medical equipment. An example is billing Medicare for a power-assisted wheelchair while only giving the patient a manual wheelchair.

Duplicate claims
In this case a provider does not submit exactly the same bill, but changes some small portion like the date in order to charge Medicare twice for the same service rendered. Rather than a single claim being filed twice, the same service is billed two times in an attempt to be paid twice.

Unbundling
Bills for a particular service are submitted in piecemeal, that appear to be staggered out over time. These services would normally cost less when bundled together, but by manipulating the claim, a higher charge is billed to Medicare resulting in a higher pay out to the party committing the fraud.

Excessive services
Occurs when Medicare is billed for something greater than what the level of actual care requires. This can include medical related equipment as well as services.

Unnecessary services

Unlike excessive services, this fraudulent scheme occurs when claims are filed for care that in no way applies to the condition of a patient, such as an echo cardiogram billed for a patient with a sprained ankle.

Kickbacks
Kickbacks are rewards such as cash, jewelry, free vacations, corporate sponsored retreats, or other lavish gifts used to entice medical professionals into using specific medical services. This could be a small cash kickback for the use of an MRI when not required, or a lavish doctor/patient retreat that is funded by a pharmaceutical company to entice the prescription and use of a particular drug. Other forms of payment that could be illegal kickbacks include paid speaking positions at events, consulting contracts, and research grants.

People engaging in this type of fraud are also subject to the federal Anti-Kickback statute.

Examples
In the case United States ex rel. Donigian v. St. Jude Medical, Inc., No. 06-CA-11166-DPW (D. Mass.) St. Jude Medical, Inc. agreed to pay $16 million to quiet allegations of paying kickbacks to physicians. The whistleblower was able to provide detailed insider information as to the nature of the kickbacks, which ranged from entertainment to sporting event tickets and other gifts. The relator in this case was awarded $2.64 million.

The case United States et al., ex rel. Jim Conrad and Constance Conrad v. Forest Pharmaceuticals, Inc, et al., No. 02-cv-11738-NG (D. Mass.) involved a drug manufacturer selling a drug, Levothroid, that had never been approved by the FDA. These allegations settled for $42.5 million due to multiple whistleblowers stepping forward to provide detailed information on the alleged fraud. The collective reward to the relators in this case was over $14.6 million.

Copied and pasted entries into the Electronic Medical Record may constitute fraud. A U.S. Department of Veterans Affairs, Veterans Health Administration pulmonologist at the Montgomery, Alabama facility copied and pasted data entered by other physicians into electronic medical records that he signed. The VA Office of the Medical Inspector reported this finding to Congress in 2013.

In the UAE, some doctors and hospital managers have done a lot of fraud. They conduct unnecessary surgeries so that they can make extra money.  

In the case United States ex rel. Brown v. Celgene Corp., CV10-3165, drug company Celgene agreed to pay $280 million on the eve of trial. The settlement resolved allegations that the company marketed and sold cancer drugs Thalomid and Revlimid for non-FDA approved uses.

In the case US v. Javaid Perwaiz, former OBGYN Perwaiz, a gynecologist from Pakistan and in Virginia, performed unnecessary surgeries on women. He was charged with 26 counts of health care fraud, 33 counts of false statements related to health care matters, 3 counts of aggravated identity theft, and 1 count of criminal forfeiture-health care fraud. He faced a maximum of 539 years (6,648 months) if convicted of all counts.  The jury found him guilty of 23 counts of health care fraud and 30 counts of false statements related to health care matters. He faced 475 years. That would give him 10 years for 13 health care fraud counts and 20 years for 10 others because those 10 others resulted in serious bodily injury, and 5 years for false statements related to healthcare matters. When prosecutors asked for 50 years, they returned with 9 more. According to Federal Bureau of Prisons, Perwaiz is currently incarcerated at FCI Cumberland Camp and his release date is February 16, 2070.

Reporting fraud
There are many ways to report cases of fraud. If a patient or health care provider believes they have witnessed Health Care Fraud, they are encouraged to contact the FBI via either their local office, telephone, or the online tips form.

If, however, they want to ensure the government actively investigates the alleged fraud, they are encouraged to contact legal counsel from an experienced firm that specializes in qui tam litigation under the False Claims Act. A good legal team can advise potential whistleblowers of their rights, protections, and what evidence is necessary to solidify a case against the group leading the fraud.

See also
 Healthcare fraud
 Medicare fraud

References

External links
 Masterminds Behind Pharmaceutical Fraud Deserve Prison Time
 Health Care Fraud and Abuse Control Program Report, US Dept of Health and Human Services

Fraud
Healthcare in the United States
Medical crime